Memories Ad-Lib is an album by singer Joe Williams with Count Basie featuring tracks recorded in 1958 which was originally released on the Roulette label. It is notable for featuring several short solo passages by rhythm guitarist Freddie Green.

Reception

AllMusic awarded the album 4 stars and its review by Ken Dryden states, "it will be greatly appreciated by fans of Count Basie and Joe Williams".

Track listing
 "Ain't Misbehavin'" (Harry Brooks, Andy Razaf, Fats Waller) – 3:27
 "I'll Always Be in Love With You" (Bud Green, Herman Ruby, Sam H. Stept) – 2:45
 "Sweet Sue, Just You" (Victor Young, Will J. Harris) – 2:20
 "If I Could Be with You (One Hour Tonight)" (James P. Johnson, Henry Creamer) – 3:10
 "Dinah" (Harry Akst, Sam M. Lewis, Joe Young) – 3:20
 "Sometimes I'm Happy" (Vincent Youmans, Irving Caesar) – 2:49 Bonus track on CD reissue 	
 "Baby Won't You Please Come Home" (Charles Warfield, Clarence Williams) – 2:22 	
 "Call Me Darling (Call Me Sweetheart, Call Me Dear)" (Dorothy Dick, Mort Fryberg, Rolf Marbet, Bert Reisfeld) – 3:06
 "The One I Love (Belongs to Somebody Else)" (Isham Jones, Gus Kahn) – 2:40 	
 "Memories of You" (Eubie Blake, Razaf) – 3:22
 "Honeysuckle Rose" (Waller, Razaf) – 2:26
 "All of Me" (Gerald Marks, Seymour Simons) – 2:40 Bonus track on CD reissue

Personnel 
Joe Williams – vocals
Count Basie – organ
Harry Edison – trumpet
Freddie Green – guitar
George Duvivier – bass
Jimmy Crawford – drums

References 

1959 albums
Albums produced by Teddy Reig
Count Basie albums
Joe Williams (jazz singer) albums
Roulette Records albums